Çuxuryurd (also, Chukhuryurd and Chukhuryurt) is a village in the Agsu Rayon of Azerbaijan.

References 

Populated places in Agsu District